Odontolabis siva is a beetle of the Family Lucanidae.

Monograph 
 Lacroix, J.-P., 1984 - The Beetles of the World, volume 4, Odontolabini I (Lucanidae) - Genera Chalcodes, Odontolabis, Heterochtes.

External links
Photos of Odontolabis siva parryi from Taiwan

Odontolabis
Insects of Taiwan
Beetles described in 1845